Alberto David (born 26 March 1970) is a Luxembourgian-Italian chess grandmaster. He is a three-time Italian Chess Champion.

Chess career
David was born in Milan in 1970, and in 1974 moved with his parents to Luxembourg, where he learned to play chess a year later. He attained some success at the youth level but it was not until he finished his philosophy studies in London in 1992 that his chess career began. He earned his grandmaster title in 1998, becoming Luxembourg's first grandmaster. He competed for Luxembourg at the Chess Olympiads of 1994, 1996, 1998, 2000, 2002 and 2006, playing on the  each time. In 2002 he won the individual silver medal with a score of 84.6% (+10–1=2). In 2012 he obtained Italian citizenship and transferred to the Italian Chess Federation in July of the same year. He competed for Italy on board 2 at the 2014 Olympiad.

David's tournament victories include the HZ Tournament in Vlissingen in 1999, the 1st NAO Chess Club GM tournament in Paris in 2003, the Paris Chess Championship in 2003 and 2005, and the inaugural Riga Technical University Open in Riga in 2011. David won the Italian Chess Championship in 2012 and 2016 (after winning the playoff against Sabino Brunello) and again in 2019. In 2022 he won the Festival International des Jeunes tournament in Paris after winning on tie-break with Niels Willems.

References

External links
Alberto David chess games at 365Chess.com

1970 births
Living people
Chess grandmasters
Luxembourgian chess players
Chess Olympiad competitors
Italian emigrants to Luxembourg
Italian chess players
People with acquired Italian citizenship
Sportspeople from Milan